Jan Åge Fjørtoft (born 10 January 1967) is a Norwegian former professional footballer. A powerful centre forward with goalscoring ability, he played professionally in Norway, Austria, England and Germany. He appeared in 71 international matches (15 as captain) and scored 20 goals for the Norway national team. His nickname was Fjøra, meaning The Feather in Norwegian.

Club career
Fjørtoft started his senior career at Hødd (2. league Norway) as 17-year-old, scoring 9 league goals in 17 matches in the 1984 season. In the 1985 season he scored 25 league goals in 22 games.

After starting in Norway with Hødd, HamKam and Lillestrøm and spending four seasons in the Austrian Bundesliga with Rapid Wien – where he became only the second foreigner to be Player of the Year in 1989 – Fjørtoft spent several seasons in England during the 1990s. He joined Swindon Town in the summer of 1993 following their promotion to the Premiership, costing the Wiltshire club a record £500,000. He had a slow start to his career at Swindon endured a terrible start to their first ever top division campaign, failing to win any of their first 16 games.
Fjørtoft failed to find the net until after Christmas, but scored 13 goals from his final 17 games, including a hat-trick in a 3–1 win against Coventry City on 5 February 1994. However, it was not enough to prevent Swindon from going down in bottom place with a mere five league wins having conceded 100 league goals.

Fjørtoft continued to score frequently during 1994–95 and helped Swindon reach the League Cup semi-finals, but their league form was disastrous once more and he transferred to Middlesbrough on 23 March 1995 for £1.3 million. By this stage, he had scored 25 goals in all competitions for the Robins and was one of the highest scorers in the English league that season.

Meanwhile, Fjørtoft was a regular player for Middlesbrough as soon as he joined the club, and helped them finish the season as First Division champions. Due to a restructuring of the league, they were the only team to gain automatic promotion to the Premiership in 1995. He was a regular player throughout the 1995–96 campaign and, as the Norwegian partnered Brazilian playmaker Juninho, Boro finished in a respectable 12th place; although they had occupied fourth place in late autumn, a disastrous run of form coinciding with an injury crisis during mid season sabotaged their hopes of European qualification or a title challenge. Fjørtoft had scored six goals from 26 Premier League games.

But the arrival of Italian forward Fabrizio Ravanelli pushed him down the pecking order for 1996–97, and he was sold to First Division promotion chasers Sheffield United for £700,000 on 31 January 1997. In his final game for Middlesbrough Fjørtoft scored a crucial goal against Hednesford Town in the fourth round of the FA Cup. Boro would go on to reach the final after his departure.

After the Blades lost to Crystal Palace in the playoff final, he played at United until 15 January 1998, when he joined newly promoted Barnsley to have another crack at the Premiership. He was unable though, to prevent Barnsley's only season at Premier League level ending in relegation, although scoring six goals in 15 Premiership games. He left Barnsley in November 1998 to join Eintracht Frankfurt, calling time on his five-year spell in England.

Fjørtoft's next stop came in Germany with Eintracht Frankfurt, where he spent three years (25 November 1998 – 31 May 2001). He became a cult hero for the club, scoring a decisive 89th-minute goal in the final game of the 1998–99 season, saying to himself melancholically: "probably the best goal this season", keeping Eintracht up. He returned home to Norway with Stabæk, and finished his career with Lillestrøm in 2002, retiring at the age of 35.

International career
Between 1986 and 1996, Fjørtoft collected 71 caps for the Norway national team, being part of the nation's squad in the 1994 FIFA World Cup, where he appeared as a starter against Mexico (1–0) and Italy (0–1).

Post-playing career
After his retirement, Fjørtoft worked as a football commentator for NRK and did his coaching badges, but resigned when he took over the Director of Football role at Lillestrøm (LSK). After four and a half years as the director of football, he quit his job at LSK at the end of the 2008 season.

Since 2004 he has also worked as a pundit at Viasat. First as an anchor, but the last year you meet him around Europe doing his interviews with the players/coaches/leaders of the Champions League teams. He runs his own "Strategic Consultant – company" with customers in Norway and internationally.

He was chairman of MTG's foundation "MTG United for Peace" and later had the same role at Millicom.

In 2011–14, he worked as a football pundit on Sky Germany.

Since 2008 Fjørtoft has worked as an advisor for the Norwegian Football Association. In that job being at "Handshake for Peace" from the start when the founder, Kjetil Siem; came up with the idea. April 2014 Fjørtoft was named Team manager of the National Team, working close with the national coach, Per-Mathias Høgmo.

In January 2015, Fjørtoft was chosen by the Minister for Sport of Norway to lead a Strategic Group that will advise the government how to use the sport in the best possible way for the society.

He later became a pundit on ESPN FC and according to a January 2022 segment he did, he believes his goal scoring statistics on Wikipedia are incorrect and wishes them to be corrected.

Personal life
Fjørtoft's son, Markus, is a professional footballer.

Career statistics

Club

International

Scores and results list Norway's goal tally first, score column indicates score after each Fjørtoft goal

Honours
Lillestrøm
1. divisjon: 1989

Middlesbrough
Football League First Division: 1994–95

Individual
1. divisjon top scorer: 1988
Player of the year in Austria (Krone-Fußballerwahl):  1989
Football League First Division Team of the Year: 1994–95

References

External links

1967 births
Living people
People from Sande, Møre og Romsdal
Barnsley F.C. players
Eintracht Frankfurt players
Bundesliga players
Hamarkameratene players
Hamar Katedralskole alumni
IL Hødd players
Lillestrøm SK players
Middlesbrough F.C. players
Eliteserien players
Expatriate footballers in Austria
Expatriate footballers in England
Expatriate footballers in Germany
Norwegian footballers
Association football forwards
Sportspeople from Ålesund
Premier League players
Sheffield United F.C. players
SK Rapid Wien players
Austrian Football Bundesliga players
Swindon Town F.C. players
Stabæk Fotball players
Norway youth international footballers
Norway under-21 international footballers
Norway international footballers
1994 FIFA World Cup players
Norwegian expatriate sportspeople in Austria
Norwegian expatriate sportspeople in England
Norwegian expatriate sportspeople in Germany
Norwegian association football commentators
Norwegian expatriate footballers